Edda Garðarsdóttir (born 15 July 1979) is an Icelandic football coach and former player who last managed Úrvalsdeild club KR. Since her debut in 1997 she has accrued over 100 caps for Iceland's national team and competed at the UEFA Women's Euro 2009 finals in Finland.

Club career
After a spell in Denmark with Vorup FB, Edda enrolled at the University of Richmond and played college soccer for the Richmond Spiders.

From 2009 until 2012 Edda, a box-to-box midfielder, played club football in Sweden for KIF Örebro DFF. Along with Ólína Guðbjörg Viðarsdóttir, she moved to Chelsea Ladies of the English FA WSL in January 2013. An interview Edda gave in May 2013 revealed that club rules prevented Ladies players from talking to their male clubmates, unless the male player had initiated the conversation. In July the duo left Chelsea to sign for Valur in their homeland.

International career
When national team coach Siggi Eyjólfsson named his Iceland squad for UEFA Women's Euro 2013 in June 2013, Edda was conspicuously absent from the list.

Personal life
In June 2012 Edda's partner Ólína Guðbjörg Viðarsdóttir gave birth to the couple's first child, a daughter.

Achievements 
Icelandic champion six times.
Icelandic Women's Cup winner five times.
Swedish Cup one time.

Honours 
Player of the Year at KR in 2004.
Player of the Year in Breiðablik 2005 and 2006.

See also

 Foreign players in the FA WSL

References

External links

KSI Profile
Chelsea Profile

1979 births
Living people
Edda Gardarsdottir
Edda Gardarsdottir
Expatriate women's footballers in England
Expatriate women's footballers in Sweden
Edda Gardarsdottir
Edda Gardarsdottir
KIF Örebro DFF players
Chelsea F.C. Women players
Women's Super League players
Damallsvenskan players
FIFA Century Club
Lesbian sportswomen
LGBT association football players
Richmond Spiders women's soccer players
Edda Gardarsdottir
Women's association football midfielders
Edda Gardarsdottir
Edda Gardarsdottir
Edda Gardarsdottir